Historic Centre of Saint Petersburg and Related Groups of Monuments is the name used by UNESCO when it collectively designated the historic core of the Russian city of St. Petersburg, as well as buildings and ensembles located in the immediate vicinity as a World Heritage Site in 1991.

The site was recognised for its architectural heritage, fusing Baroque, Neoclassical, and traditional Russian-Byzantine influences.

Sites
The site contains 126 locations including the following objects,
 Historic Centre of St. Petersburg
 Historical Part of the Town of Kronstadt
 Fortress of Kronstadt
 Forts of the Island Kotlin
 Redoubts Dena (Fort Den)
 Fort Shanz 
 Fort Catherine 
 Fort Rift  
 Fort Constantin
 Tolbukhin Signal Tower on Tolbukhin Island 
 Forts of the Gulf of Finland  
 Obrutchev Fort  
 Totleben Fort  
 North Forts Nos. 1-7  
 Paul Fort (Riesbank)  
 Kronshlot Fort  
 Alexander Fort ("Tchumny") 
 Peter Fort 
 South Forts Nos. 1-3  
 Forts of the Coast of the Gulf of Finland  
 Fort Lissy Noss  
 Fort Inno
 Grey Horse Fort (Seraya Lochad) 
 Krasnaya Gorka fort (Red Hill) 
 Civil Engineering
 the Barrier of Cribwork  
 the Barrier of Pile  
 the Barrier of Stone  
 Historical Centre of the Town of Petrokrepost (Shlisselburg)
 The Oreshek Fortress on Orekhovy Island at the source of the Neva
 Palaces and Park Ensembles of the Town of Pushkin and its Historical Centre
 Palaces and Parks of the town of Pavlovsk and its Historical Centre
 Pulkovo Observatory
 Palace and Park Ensemble of the Village of Ropsha
 Palace and Park Ensemble of the Village of Gostilitsy 
 Palace and Park Ensemble of the Village of Taytsy  
 Palace and Park Ensemble of the Town of Gatchina and its Historical Centre
 Ensemble of the Coastal Monastery of Saint Sergius
 Palace and Park Ensemble of the Town of Strelna and its Historical Centre
 Palace and Park Ensemble "Mikhailovka"
 Palace and Park Ensemble "Znamenka"  
 Palace and Park Ensemble of the Town of Petrodvorets and its Historical Centre
 Palace and Park Ensemble "Sobstvennaya Datcha" 
 Palace and Park Ensemble "Sergeevka" 
 Palace and Park Ensembles of the Town of Lomonosov and its Historical Centre
Historical Centre of the Town of Lomonosov (Oranienbaum), including the Palace and Park Ensemble of the Upper Park and Lower Garden
Mordvinov's Estate
Maximov's Datcha
Zubov's Estate "Otrada"
Ratkov-Rozhnov's Estate "Dubki"
S. K. Grieg's Estate "Sans Ennui"
Datcha of the Hospital
 Scientific Town-Institution of Physiologist I. P. Pavlov
 Zinoviev's Estate  
 Shuvalov's Estate
 Viazemsky's Estate
 Sestroretsky Razliv 
 I. Repin Estate "The Penates" 
 Cemetery of the Village of Komarovo
 Lindulovskaya Rotcsha  
 River Neva with Banks and Embankments 
 Izhorsky Bench (Glint)  
 Dudergofs Heights  
 Koltushi Elevation  
 Yukkovskaya Elevation  
 The Roads  
 Moskovskoye Highway  
 Kievskoye Highway 
 Railway Leningrad-Pavlovsk 
 the Highway Pushkin-Gatchina  
 Volkhovskoe Highway  
 Tallinskoye Highway  
 Peterhofskoye Highway  
 Ropshinskoye Highway  
 Gostilitskoye Highway  
 Primorskoye Highway  
 Vyborgskoye Highway
 Koltushskoye Highway
 Canals 
 Ligovsky Canal  
 the Maritime Channel  
 Petrovsky canal
 Kronstadsky canal 
 Zelenogorsky canal 
 The Green Belt of Glory  
 the Blockade Ring
 the Road of Life
 Oranienbaumsky Spring-Board

References

Gardens in Russia
Neoclassical architecture in Russia
Palaces in Russia
Parks and open spaces in Saint Petersburg
World Heritage Sites in Russia
Buildings and structures in Saint Petersburg
Palaces in Saint Petersburg
Cultural heritage monuments of federal significance in Saint Petersburg